Helmcken House is a museum in Victoria, British Columbia, located in Thunderbird Park. It was built by Dr. John Sebastian Helmcken, the first doctor in Victoria, in 1852, a surgeon with the Hudson's Bay Company. It is one of the oldest houses in British Columbia. Some interesting items on display include his medical kit.

See also
 Statue of John Sebastian Helmcken

References

External links
Helmcken House from BC Heritage Branch.

History of Victoria, British Columbia
Houses completed in 1852
Museums in Victoria, British Columbia
Historic house museums in British Columbia
1852 establishments in the British Empire